The Knorr Hut is a mountain hut belonging to the German Alpine Club and located in the Wetterstein Mountains at a height of 2,052 m. Its lies right on the edge of the Zugspitzplatt where it drops into the Reintalanger in a location with scenic views and is an important base for hikers who can climb up to it on the normal route from the town of Garmisch-Partenkirchen through the Reintal valley to Germany's highest mountain, the Zugspitze.

The Knorr Hut is rated as category I, and belongs to the Munich Section of the German Alpine Club (DAV).

History 

The Knorr Hut was built by 1855 as a small, rude refuge hut, the merchant, Angelo Knorr, contributing "a significant sum of money" towards it.
By 1860 the hut had become run down, because "the maintenance of the same had been paid little attention". Finally the Munich Section of the newly founded German Alpine Club took over the hut. As well as the section itself, "the Royal District Office of Werdenfels, as well as His Royal Highness Prince Otto of Bavaria and Mr Julius Knorr contributed a considerable sum" towards its upgrade and extension. On 10 August 1873 the work had proceeded sufficiently, that the newly built hut could be handed over to fulfil its purpose. At that time it offered "comfortable accommodation" for 20 to 25 people (overnighting for 12 people).
A contemporary publication describes the hut in the following words:

Approaches and tours 
 From Garmisch-Partenkirchen (Olympic Stadium) through the Partnach Gorge into the Reintal valley (Bock Hut) and pas the former Blaue Gumpe,  destroyed on 23 August 2005 by heavy rain, to the Reintalanger Hut (1,366 m). From there – a detour to the source of the Partnach is worthwhile – onwards and ca. 700 metres upwards to the Knorr Hut. Duration without stops ca. 6 to 7 hours.
 From Ehrwald to the Ehrwalder Alm (1,500 m), this section can also be covered using the gondola lift from Ehrwald. Continues past the Pest Chapel and the Feldern Jöchel (2,041 m) and over the Gatterl (border crossing) and along the Plattsteig trail to the Knorr Hut. Immediately beyond the Gatterl the hut can already be seen on the other side of the Platt, directly under the Brunntalkopf (2,264 m). Duration without stops from the Ehrwalder Alm ca. 2½ hours.
 The Knorr Hut is an ideal base for crossing the Jubilee Ridge to the Zugspitze. A marked climbing path with several easy climbs goes up to the Brunntalkopf and over the linking ridge that descends from the Inner Höllentalspitze to the Jubilee Ridge, which is joined at a point between the Inner and Middle Höllentalspitze at 2,650 m. Roughly two to three hours of exposed ridge walking and climbing with splendid views of the Höllental valley to the north, the  Zugspitzplatt to the south and the summit of the Zugspitze itself. From there in two to three hours via the Platt back to the Knorr Hut.

Gallery

Sources 
 
 TheEinweihung der „Knorr Hut". In: Eduard Amthor (Hrsg.): Monatshefte für Verbreitung von Alpenkunde unter Jung und Alt in populären und unterhaltenden Schilderungen aus dem Gesammtgebiet der Alpenwelt und mit praktischen Winken to the genußvollen Bereisung derselben. Jahrgang 1874. Amthor, Gera, S. 61 ff.
 Stefan Beulke: Wetterstein. Ein Führer für Täler, Hütten und Berge, verfasst nach den Richtlinien der UIAA. 5. Auflage. Alpenvereinsführer, Reihe Nördliche Kalkalpen. Bergverlag Rudolf Rother, Munich, 1996, .

References

External links 

 The Munich and Oberland sections of the DAV

Mountain huts in Germany
Buildings and structures in Garmisch-Partenkirchen (district)